Stefanos Tassopoulos (born 1939 in Volos) is a Greek novelist, playwright and poet. He read Law at the University of Athens; he also studied Theatre and journalism and worked as a journalist. He died in Athens on February 5, 2013.

Works
Εδώ (Here), (play, 1971)
Μνηστρόμνηστα, (play, 1975)
Ημερολόγιο νυκτός (Night Journal), (poems, 1979)
Δεκαπενθήμερο (Fortnight), (novel, 1983)
Ηλιακό Ωρολόγιο (Sundial), (novel, 1988)

External links
His page at the website of the Hellenic Authors' Society (Greek)

Notes

1939 births
2013 deaths
National and Kapodistrian University of Athens alumni
Greek novelists
20th-century Greek poets
Greek male poets
20th-century Greek male writers
Writers from Volos